Ross Rowing Club is a rowing club on the River Wye, based at The Ropewalk, Ross-on-Wye, Herefordshire. The Ross Regatta is held over the August Bank Holiday weekend.

History
The club was founded in 1870 with the club's first headquarters being at the Hope Public House. The first boathouse was built in 1908 costing £400 and in 1947 and 2009 the club won the West of England Challenge Vase. A new clubhouse was built in the late 1970s and a new boat store was built in 1985.

In recent years the club has produced national champions.

Honours

National champions

References

Sport in Herefordshire
Rowing clubs in England
Ross-on-Wye